Secchi is a small lunar impact crater formation on the northwest edge of Mare Fecunditatis. It was named after the 19th-century Italian astronomer Angelo Secchi. To the northeast is the crater Taruntius. The western rim is joined with a section of the minor Montes Secchi range. The rim of this crater has been opened in the northern and southern ends, leaving two curved ridges facing each other across the crater floor. To the south is a pair of rilles designated the Rimae Secchi. These lie near the edge of the mare, and have a combined length of about 40 kilometers.

Satellite craters
By convention these features are identified on lunar maps by placing the letter on the side of the crater midpoint that is closest to Secchi.

References

 
 
 
 
 
 
 
 
 
 
 

Impact craters on the Moon